Unstoppable. Sean Scully & The Art of Everything is a 2019 documentary film about a year in the life of the abstract painter Sean Scully.

Unstoppable screened on BBC 2 at 9pm on 6 April 2019, marking the return of the BBC's Arena.

Critical reception 
Chris Bennion in The Times on 6 April 2019 described the film as "excellent" and said that "Scully is an absolute knockout of a documentary subject, always ready with a quotable line or a self-mythologising story. You might not know much about abstract art, but you'll like Scully".

On 6 April 2019, Vicki Power in The Daily Telegraph wrote that 'Nick Willing treats his subject with a light touch and beautifully captures the artist and his work' whilst on '7 April 2019 Chris Harvey, also in The Telegraph, described the film as 'superb'

Suzi Feay in the Financial Times (5 April 2019) gave the film four stars:: "By the end of Unstoppable: Sean Scully and the Art of Everything (Saturday, BBC2, 9pm), there has been much to absorb about showmanship, self-belief and selling."

The Guardian chose Unstoppable for its Pick of the Day and Gwilym Mumford wrote: "As one admirer puts it in this documentary portrait, the Irish abstract painter Sean Scully's striking striped and chequered works act as "sounding boards for the soul". On top of their aesthetic qualities, they have made Scully one of the world's most saleable artists, one whose works are hung everywhere from New York to Shanghai."

David Crawford in the Radio Times wrote: "Scully is a fascinating character, a bullish self-promoter whose mantra of "I don't care" masks a thoughtful, tender personality. Nick Willing's film explores those contradictions in lively style, much as Scully slaps paint on to his bold, vivid works."

In his lengthy review Kenny Schachter in ArtNet News(6 May 2019) said: "The program is as much about Scully as it is symptomatic of a media- and celebrity-saturated world, and of our proclivity to stuff a foot (or two) into our collective mouths whenever a camera (or recorder) is switched on."

References

External links 
 

BBC Television shows
2019 television films
2019 films